Gibson Station is an unincorporated community in Lee County, Virginia, United States.

History
Gibson Station contained a post office from 1872 until 1966. The community was named for Maj. George Gibson, an early resident.

References

Unincorporated communities in Lee County, Virginia
Unincorporated communities in Virginia